Achatocarpus is a genus of trees and shrubs belonging to the family Achatocarpaceae. It is distributed throughout tropical South America, predominantly in Argentina. 15 species have been described, but only 9 accepted.

Taxonomy 
The genus was described by José Jerónimo Triana and published in Annales des Sciences Naturelles; Botanique, série 4 9: 45. 1858. The type species is: Achatocarpus nigricans Triana

Species 
Below is a listing of the species of the genus Achatocarpus accepted until January 2017, in alphabetical order. For each indicated the binomial name followed by author.

 Achatocarpus balansae Schinz & Autran
 Achatocarpus brevipedicellatus H.Walter
 Achatocarpus gracilis H.Walter
 Achatocarpus hasslerianus Heimerl
 Achatocarpus microcarpus Schinz & Autran
 Achatocarpus nigricans Triana
 Achatocarpus oaxacanus Standl.
 Achatocarpus praecox Griseb.
 Achatocarpus pubescens C.H.Wright
Synonyms:
 Achatocarpus brasiliensis H.Walter = Achatocarpus praecox var. praecox.

References

External links

Caryophyllales genera
Caryophyllales